The Pennsylvania Macaroni Company is a comedy EP by Patton Oswalt. The EP features all improv, and includes Brian Posehn, Eugene Mirman, Maria Bamford as guests on the CD.

Track listing
Two Miniature Joe Pescis – 6:41
Eugene Mirman & Maria Bamford Versus Brian Posehn – 3:56
Pennsylvania Macaroni Company (Opens at 10A.M. – Noon on Sunday) – 7:54

References

2006 EPs
Patton Oswalt albums
Comedy EPs